Palacio Alcorta was originally a large test track that was converted into a housing complex in the neighborhood of Palermo Chico, Buenos Aires.

Summary 
Mario Palanti, an Italian architect, designed the Palacio Alcorta in 1927. It was known formerly known as "Palacio Chrysler" and eventually was promoted as the first Autodromo Palace. The Palacio Alcorta was constructed from 1927–1928 and was eventually remodeled in 1994. It was originally commercial, but is now residential. It has three floors, and it is in the shape of a circle. The inside circle had its own test track outdoor vehicles, called "Stadium Olimpo". It is equipped with a test track of slightly over a mile long. The Palacio Alcorta was used for testing cars, and it had the capacity for three thousand people to be in it. However, by 1990,  the site was no longer used for testing cars and was taken over by a development company who converted it into apartments and offices.

References 

Buildings and structures in Buenos Aires
1927 in Argentina